OHC can refer to:

 Ocean heat content, the thermal energy held in the oceans
 Oetker Hotel Management GmbH, a German hotel management company also known as Oetker Collection
 Ohio Heritage Conference, a high school athletic league in Ohio, U.S.
 Ontario Health Coalition, an organization that advocates publicly funded health care in Ontario, Canada
 Open House Chicago, a festival in Chicago, Illinois, U.S.
 Outer hair cell, a component in the mammalian cochlear amplifier
 Overhead cam, a component in a particular location in an overhead camshaft engine

See also
 Order of the Holy Cross (disambiguation)